The 2011–12 season of the Segunda División de Futsal was the 19th season of second-tier futsal in Spain.

Oxipharma and Martorell were originally the promoted teams but both teams gave up due to financial reasons. Two vacancy seats were filled by Gáldar Gran Canaria and Burela Pescados Rubén.

Teams

Regular season standings 

 ElPozo Ciudad de Murcia and Barcelona B Alusport did not play the promotion playoffs due to be reserve teams.
 Oxipharma gives up to promotion for failing to meet the LNFS financial criteria to play in Primera División.
 Playas de Castellón, although finished in 16th position on standings, was readmitted in Segunda División due to vacant seats.
 Manzanares, Sala 5 Martorell & Unión Africa Ceutí, were relegated for failing to meet the LNFS financial criteria to play in Segunda División.

Promotion playoffs

Bracket

1st round

1st leg

2nd leg

3rd leg

2nd round

1st leg

2nd leg

3rd leg

 Sala 5 Martorell gives up to promotion to Primera División for failing to find a main sponsor that provides the required budget to play in Primera División. Also gives up to play in Segunda División.

Top goal scorers

References

External links
Full schedule
2011–12 season at lnfs.es

See also
2011–12 Primera División de Futsal
2011–12 Copa del Rey de Futsal
Segunda División B de Futsal

2011–12 in Spanish futsal
Futsal2
Segunda División de Futsal seasons